Petamburan is an administrative village in the Tanah Abang district of Indonesia. It has postal code of 10260.  The area is 0.90 km2. The population is 32,946 as of 2019. There are 16,900 males and 16,046 females.

Origin 
There are two theories behind this name. One suggests that every European who died, the locals would play the drums. Another suggests that this is where military drums are made, because the army needs it.

Geography 
It is located bordered by West Jakarta in the north and west, Kebon in the east, and Bendungan in the south.

Demographics 
Due to the location being part of the capital of Indonesia, there are various ethnicities who inhabit this area. This includes Javans, Sundans, Banten, Batak, Miningkabau, and Chinese peoples.

By religion, 83.49% are Muslims, 16.00% Christians (13.00% Protestants & 3.00% Catholics), 0.30% Hindus, and 0.20% Buddhists.

See also 
 Tanah Abang
 List of administrative villages of Jakarta

References 

Administrative villages in Jakarta